Choloepus is a genus of xenarthran mammals of Central and South America within the monotypic family Choloepodidae, consisting of two-toed sloths, sometimes also called two-fingered sloths. The two species of Choloepus (which means "lame foot"), Linnaeus's two-toed sloth (Choloepus didactylus) and Hoffmann's two-toed sloth (Choloepus hoffmanni), were formerly believed on the basis of morphological studies to be the only surviving members of the sloth family Megalonychidae, but have now been shown by molecular results to be closest to extinct ground sloths of the family Mylodontidae.

Extant species

Evolution
A study of retrovirus and mitochondrial DNA suggests that C. didactylus and C. hoffmani diverged 6 to 7 million years ago. Furthermore,  based on cytochrome c oxidase subunit I sequences, a similar divergence date ( years ago) between the two populations of C. hofmanni separated by the Andes has been reported. Their ancestors evolved with marine vertebrae, the three toed-sloth and the manatee are the only other mammals with similar vertebrae.

Relation to the three-toed sloth
Both types of sloth tend to occupy the same forests; in most areas, a particular species of the somewhat smaller and generally slower-moving three-toed sloth (Bradypus) and a single species of the two-toed type will jointly predominate. Although similar in overall appearance, the relationship between the two genera is not close. Recent phylogenetic analyses support analysis of morphological data from the 1970s and 1980s, indicating the two genera are not closely related and adapted to their arboreal lifestyles independently. It was unclear from this work from which ground-dwelling sloth taxa the three-toed sloths evolved. Based on the morphological comparisons, it was thought the two-toed sloths nested phylogenetically within one of the divisions of Caribbean sloths. Though data has been collected on over 33 different species of sloths by analyzing bone structures, many of the relationships between clades on a phylogenetic tree were unclear. 

Much of the morphological evidence to support the hypothesis of diphyly has been based on the structure of the inner ear. Most morphological studies have concluded that convergent evolution is the mechanism that resulted in today’s two genera of tree sloths. This means that the extant genera evolved analogous traits, such as locomotion methods, size, habitat, and many other traits independently from one another as opposed to from their last common ancestor. This makes tree sloths “one of the most striking examples of convergent evolution known among mammals”.

Recently obtained molecular data from collagen and mitochondrial DNA sequences fall in line with the diphyly (convergent evolution) hypothesis, but have overturned some of the other conclusions obtained from morphology. These investigations consistently place two-toed sloths close to mylodontids and three-toed sloths within Megatherioidea, close to Megalonyx, megatheriids and nothrotheriids. They make the previously recognized family Megalonychidae polyphyletic, with both two-toed sloths and the Caribbean sloths being moved out of that family and away from Megalonyx. Caribbean sloths are placed in a separate, basal branch of the sloth evolutionary tree.

The following sloth family phylogenetic tree is based on collagen and mitochondrial DNA sequence data (see Fig. 4 of Presslee et al., 2019).

Characteristics

The name "two-toed sloth" was intended to describe an anatomical difference between the genera Choloepus and Bradypus, but does so in a potentially misleading way. Members of Choloepus have two digits on their forelimbs (the thoracic limbs) and three digits on their hindlimbs (the pelvic limbs), while members of Bradypus have three digits on all limbs. Although the term "two-fingered" sloth is arguably less misleading, the shorter "two-toed" is much more widely used.

Other distinguishing features include a more prominent snout, longer fur, and the absence of a tail.

Behaviour
Two-toed sloths spend most of their lives hanging upside down from trees. They cannot walk, so they pull hand-over-hand to move around, which is at an extremely slow rate. Being predominantly nocturnal, their fur, which grows greenish algae to blend in, is their main source of protection. Their body temperatures depend at least partially on the ambient temperature; they cannot shiver to keep warm, as other mammals do, because of their unusually low metabolic rates and reduced musculature. Two-toed sloths also differ from three-toed sloths in their climbing behavior, preferring to descend head first.

Lifecycle

Two-toed sloths have a gestation period of six months to a year, depending on the species. The mother gives birth to a single young, while hanging upside down. The young are born with claws, and are weaned after about a month, although they will remain with the mother for several more months, and do not reach sexual maturity until the age of three years, in the case of females, or four to five years, in the case of males. During natal dispersion, two-toed sloths prefer tropical forests over other types of habitat, often using riparian forest buffers to disperse. Although they also occupy shade-grown cacao plantations, they avoid open pastures.

Feeding
They eat primarily leaves, but also shoots, fruits, nuts, berries, bark, some native flowers, and even some small vertebrates. In addition, when they cannot find food, they have been known to eat the algae that grow on their fur for nutrients. They have large, four-chambered stomachs, which help to ferment the large amount of plant matter they eat. Food can take up to a month to digest due to their slow metabolism. Depending on when in the excretion cycle a sloth is weighed, urine and feces may account for up to 30% of the animal’s body weight, which averages about 6 kg (13 lb). They get most of their fluids from water in the leaves that they eat but sloths have also been observed drinking directly from rivers.

Dentition and skeleton
Two-toed sloths have a reduced, ever growing dentition, with no incisors or true canines, which overall lacks homology with the dental formula of other mammals. Their first tooth is very canine-like in shape and is referred to as a caniniform. It is separated from the other teeth, or molariforms, by a diastema. The molariforms are used specifically for grinding and are mortar and pestle-like in appearance and function. Thus, they can grind food for easier digestibility, which takes the majority of their energy. The dental formula of two-toed sloths is:  (unau)

Two-toed sloths are unusual among mammals in possessing as few as five cervical vertebrae, which may be due to mutations in the homeotic genes. All other mammals have seven cervical vertebrae, other than the three-toed sloth and the manatee.

Notes

References

  (1758): Systema naturae perregna tria naturae, secundum classes, ordines, genera, species cum characteribus, differentiis, syonymis, locis. Laurentii : Salvi, 824 pp.

External links

National Geographic: Two-toed sloth profile
Bristol Zoo: Two-toed sloth
National Zoo: Two-toed sloth
America Zoo: Two-toed sloth
Animal Diversity: Family Megalonychidae

Sloths
Mammals of Colombia
Taxa named by Carl Linnaeus